Chelsea School District is a school district in Chelsea, Michigan, United States.

It operates these schools:
Chelsea High School 
Beach Middle School 
South Meadows Elementary School 
North Creek Elementary School 
Chelsea Early Childhood Center

External links

School districts in Michigan
Chelsea, Michigan